Zagórze is the biggest, northernmost district of Sosnowiec, totally transformed with building the Huta Katowice (expanded,  reached as far as ).

History

In the 10th century, the area became part of the emerging Polish state under the Piast dynasty. In the 11th-12th century, there was a metallurgical settlement in which lead and silver were smelted. The oldest known mention of Zagórze comes from a document from 1228. In the 14th century, a motte-and-bailey castle was built, and it is now an archaeological site. Archaeologists discovered tools from the Stone Age at the site. In the following centuries, Zagórze was a private village of Polish nobility, including the Jarocki and Mieroszewski families. There is a Neoclassical palace of the Mieroszewski family in Zagórze.

In 1827, it had a population of 457, which grew to 721 until the late 19th century. In 1842 a zinc smelter was established in Zagórze.

In 1975, Zagórze was included within the city limits of Sosnowiec as its new district. Before that, it was a separate town in Będzin County.

References

Sosnowiec
Neighbourhoods in Silesian Voivodeship
Archaeological sites in Poland
Prehistoric sites in Poland